Saadatabad (also Romanized as Sa‘ādatābād) is a village in Beyza Rural District, Beyza District, Sepidan County, Fars Province, Iran. Saadatabad had a population 475, and the members of that population make up a total of 108 families according to the 2006 Iranian census.

References 

Populated places in Beyza County